Hilda von Puttkammer (born 13 August 1912, date of death unknown) was a Brazilian fencer. She competed in the women's individual foil event at the 1936 Summer Olympics.

References

External links
 

1912 births
Year of death missing
Brazilian female foil fencers
Olympic fencers of Brazil
Fencers at the 1936 Summer Olympics